The H2O Purépechas Fútbol Club is a Mexican football club based in Morelia. The club was founded on 25 July 2021, and currently plays in the Liga TDP.

History

In August 2021, an agreement was reached between the sports club, the Axon Capital company and Atlético Morelia to register the team in the Liga TDP, the fourth category of Mexican football. The team is managed by the financial company, but most of the players come from Atlético Morelia youth teams, since  is the reserve team.

The team officially debuted on September 25, 2021, defeating Atlético Chavinda 2–0. 

In October 2021, the team began playing its home matches at Estadio Venustiano Carranza, after having played its first matches at a local sports complex.

Stadium 

Estadio Venustiano Carranza is a multi-use stadium in Morelia, Mexico, used mostly for football matches and athletics. It was initially used as the home stadium of Monarcas Morelia. It was replaced by Estadio Morelos when Monarcas Morelia moved in 1989. The stadium capacity is 17,600 spectators.

Players

First-team squad

References

 
Football clubs in Michoacán
Association football clubs established in 2021
2021 establishments in Mexico